Høydalsmo is a village in Tokke Municipality in Vestfold og Telemark county, Norway. The village is located along the north shore of the lake Oftevant in the northeastern part of the municipality. The European route E134 highway runs through the village. The village area has about 300 permanent residents.

Høydalsmo is known for its skiing facilities. Høydalsmo hosted the Norwegian cross-country skiing championships in 2002.

It was built in 1785, replacing a medieval stave church on the same site.

The wrestler Grom Gravalid (known as Gromguten) hails from Høydalsmo.

References

Tokke
Villages in Vestfold og Telemark